Obrovac is a town located in northern Dalmatia, in the Zadar County of Croatia. The Obrovac municipality has a total population of 4,323 people. The town is located in the canyon of the river Zrmanja.

Geography

Obrovac is a town on the Zrmanja River some 11 km from the mouth of the river of the Novigrad sea. Above the town are the ruins of a fortified city. Its tributary Krupa attracts numerous day-trippers, and in recent times, rafting, canoe, and kayak lovers. Not far from the town of Krupa is a monastery with a valuable icon collection. South of the town there is extraordinary Bijela River canyon with a lot of waterfalls and small ponds and pools.

History

Obrovac first got its name in 1337. In 1527 Obrovac was taken over by the Ottoman Turks. 

In October 1683, the population of Venetian Dalmatia, principally Uskoks of Ravni kotari, took arms and together with the rayah (lower class) of the Ottoman frontier regions rose up, taking Skradin, Karin, Vrana, Benkovac and Obrovac. In 1687, Stojan Janković, a Morlach leader, forced the Ottomans out of Obrovac.

In 2008, Obrovac unveiled a restored riviera, which was the biggest financial investment in the city since Croatian independence. In 2009, a mass grave from World War II was found in the area.

Demographics
The total population is 4,323, distributed in the following settlements:

 Bilišane, population 176
 Bogatnik, population 131
 Golubić, population 132
 Gornji Karin, population 1,125
 Kaštel Žegarski, population 135
 Komazeci, population 42
 Krupa, population 127
 Kruševo, population 1,112
 Muškovci, population 100
 Nadvoda, population 170
 Obrovac, population 996
 Zelengrad, population 77

The municipality's population peaked at 13,498 in the 1971 census. In the 1970s and 1980s, due to a low living standard in the area, Obrovac was significantly affected by emigration.

According to the 1991 census, shortly before the start of the Croatian War of Independence, 65.5% of population declared as ethnic Serbs. During Operation Storm, a large portion of the town population evacuated the area before the Croatian Army entered the town on 5 August 1995, the second day of the operation. The current majority are Croats with 65.7%, while 31.4% are Serbs.

People from Obrovac
Janko Mitrović (1613–1659), Morlach army leader
Stojan Janković (1636–1687), Morlach army leader
Simeon Končarević (1690–1769), Serbian Orthodox bishop of Dalmatia and Albania
Gerasim Zelić (1752–1828), Serbian Orthodox archimandrite and writer
Dado Pršo's family
Milan Pršo
Arijan Komazec
Obrad Zelić

References

Sources

Further reading

External links

 

Cities and towns in Croatia
Populated places in Zadar County